Royal Air Force Station Reykjavik or more simply RAF Reykjavik is a former Royal Air Force station, at Reykjavík Airport, Iceland.

Beginnings

The station was built in 1940 by the British Army and used by the Royal Air Force from March 1941 and throughout the remainder of the Second World War.

Squadrons

After the cessation of hostilities of the Second World War the British Government handed the airfield over to the Icelandic Civil Aviation Authority on 6 July 1946. It is now known as Reykjavik Airport.

References

Citations

Bibliography

 

Reykjavik
Rey
Airports in Iceland